The Guadalope (Guadalop in Catalan and Aragonese) is a river in Aragon, Spain. It is a tributary of the Ebro (Ebre in Catalan).

Course
It receives water from rivulets originating in the Sierra de la Cañada and Sierra Carrascosa. Flowing northeastwards its waters fill the Santolea reservoir, then the dam of Calanda, before it enters the Ebro at Caspe.

In addition to the towns mentioned, it also flows through Alcañiz and Civan. Tributaries of the Guadalope include the Bergantes, Fortanete, Bordón and Mezquín on the right side, and the Aliaga River and the Guadalopillo on the left.

See also 
 List of rivers of Spain

References

External links 

 Coto deportivo de pesca
 Regadíos 
 El periódico de Aragón
Hoces del Guadalope

Rivers of Spain
Ebro basin
Maestrazgo
Rivers of Aragon